Babino (Macedonian Бабино) is a small village in the municipality of Demir Hisar, in the area of Zeleznik, in the vicinity of the town of Demir Hisar. It used to be part of the former municipality of Sopotnica.

The village is best known for having the largest private library in North Macedonia, the private library "Al-Bi" owned by Stevo Stepanovski, which has over 20,000 books, making it a tourist destination for bibliophiles.

According to the classification of the Ministry of Local Self-Government, Babino belongs to the category of hilly and mountainous villages.

Geography
Babino is located in the central part of the former Municipality of Sopotnica, 18.5 km northwest of Demir Hisar, and is located on both sides of the Babinska River, a tributary of the source catchment area of Crna River, in the eastern part of Plakenska Mountain. It is 45 km away from Bitola, and 35 km from Kichevo, with which it is connected by an asphalt road. It is a hilly village located at an altitude of 750 meters. The climate is temperate. The area of the village is 9.9 square kilometers.

The village is located between the three hills Pavlov Rid (911), Tri Sinori (1,111) and Kurati (1,017).

There are many springs in the area of Babino. Along the Bazernicka River, there is a spring almost every 100 meters, starting from Gorni Livadi, all the way to the confluence with the Crna River. The water from the springs replenishes the river.

The village is divided into three neighborhoods: Upper, Lower and Middle.

There is a bus station two kilometers outside the village.

Surrounding villages are: Malo Ilino and Bazernik from the southwest and west, Dolenci and Zeleznec from the north and northeast, Žvan from the southeast, and Sloeshtica from the south.

History
Judging by the archeological site Vrteshka, the village has been inhabited at least since late antiquity.

The village is mentioned in the Ottoman census books from 1467/68 with 27 families and 2 unmarried, or a total of 137 inhabitants. The population paid a tax for wheat, barley, streets, pigs, mills, vineyards, watermelons and weddings (a tax paid only by Christians), 725 silver Turkish money.

In the census book of 1568 the village had 140 inhabitants.

In the Ottoman records from 1611-1612 the village is listed as Babine with 47 tax-paying households.

In 1683 the inhabitants of Babino together with those of Kochishte, Zashle, Brezovo and Dolenci refused to pay the tax and killed their collector.

In the XIX century Babino is a completely Christian village in the Bitola kaza, nahija Demir Hisar of the Ottoman Empire. The Bulgarian Exarchate was active in the village and there was a Bulgarian language school in the village.

In 1882, the first books were brought to Babino in the old house of Stevo Stepanovski's great-grandfather. He was a Turkish soldier to whom, due to lack of money from the state treasury, the Turks paid him with books. He started buying books from his comrades and made a library fund.

The village was an active center of the Ilinden Uprising. On the evening of August 1, 1903, in the Babino meadows of the locality "Ramni Livadi" the Macedonian flag was waved which was completely red, with the inscription "Freedom or death". In Babino's meadows, the detachments took an oath of "Death or Freedom" and set out to attack the village of Pribilci. The population was promptly informed to flee to the mountain. The insurgent detachments were led by: Jordan Piperkata and Nikola Dechev - vojvodi, and the village detachment was led by Vojvoda Stepan Stepanovski. The village was part of the Krushevo Republic, which lasted only 13 days. The suppression of the uprising was with the help of a Turkish army from Asia. In the last free days of the village, a group of detachments dug under the village of Babino at the place "Kula" from where they opened fire on the Turkish army. The Turkish army began to pursue the detachments and entered the villages and the Ilinska Mountain. A collision with the Turkish army took place near Ilinska Church and 7 chetniks were killed there, all from the village of Virovo.

In 1912, during the outbreak of the First Balkan War in 1912, three residents of Babino became volunteers in the Macedonian-Adrianopolitan Volunteer Corps.

There are 162 teachers from Babino, who after the Second World War spread literacy throughout Macedonia.

Legends
Residents believe the legend of the old woman from Babino, who, driven away by her daughters-in-law, lived alone deep in the forests of Ilinska Mountain for years. The expelled old woman, angry with fate, cursed the whole female gender from the end of her old age to live a lonely life just like her. Hence the belief that the village got its name Babino.

According to another legend, when the ancient Romans first conquered this territory, they started the practice of extermination of the male population, in order to facilitate assimilation and colonization. Almost all the women from the village with small children fled to the mountains and lived there for decades. When they returned to rebuild the village, they were all already grandmothers.

It is believed that the Apostle Paul passed and stayed on Pavlov Hill, who, spreading Christianity, first passed through Macedonia. He baptized several inhabitants here.

Kurati peak, on the other hand, allegedly got its name because of the "talented" men in Babino.

It is believed that the girl sung in the revolutionary song "Gjurgo came out to see the comites " comes from this village.

A curiosity is that the locals even in old age have lush hair. They are believed to have a secret remedy for hair loss.

Economy
The village economy consists mostly of farming and forestry. Arable land covers 236.2 hectares, pastures cover 161.5 hectares, while there 477.4 hectares is forested. There are ongoing initiatives for tourism development. In the past, tourism promoter Nasser Hot suggested that a park of the peoples of the world be built on Kurati Hill - typical wooden houses, representative of the traditional national houses of the peoples. But this initiative was abandoned.
According to some indicators, Babino is visited by about 25,000 tourists a year. Some of them are attracted by the natural beauties of the village, and many of them come because of the famous library. Among them are writers, academics, participants in the Struga Poetry Evenings, participants in the Macedonian Language and Culture Seminar, students at the Syrian University, Moroccan theologians, ambassadors, the biographer of Winston Churchill, etc.

Population
According to the statistics of the Bulgarian scientist Vasil Kanchov ("Macedonia. Ethnography and Statistics") from 1900, Babino had 430 inhabitants, all Macedonians.

In 1961 the number of inhabitants was 451. In 1994, the number of inhabitants decreased to 70 inhabitants - all Macedonians. According to the 2002 census, Babino's population has declined again to 34, including 33 Macedonians and one Serbian. This drastic reduction of the population is a characteristic of many villages in the Municipality of Demir Hisar.

The table below provides an overview of the population in all census years:

Research on historical families
Babino is a Macedonian village.

According to Branislav Rusic's research in 1951 genera in the village:

Indigenous: Ugleshovci (5 k.), Tokmakovci (2 k.), Radevci (4 k.), Karadakovci (2 k.), Gjurkovci (4 k.), Despotovci (14 k.), Spasenovci (5 k.), Tanevci (6 k.), Jancevci (3 k.), Grashinovci (6 k.) And Popovci (24 k.).
Immigrants of unknown origin: Strezovci (3 k.).
Immigrants of known origin: Filipovci (9 families) and Parmakovci (2 families) immigrated from the village of Karbunica in the Kichevo region ; Kochovci (1 family) and Popovci (7 families) immigrated from the village of Lesani in Debrca .

Government and politics
The village is part of the expanded Municipality of Demir Hisar, to which the former Municipality of Sopotnica was added after the new territorial division of Macedonia in 2004. In the period from 1996-2004, the village belonged to the former Municipality of Sopotnica.

In the period from 1955 to 1996, the village was located within the large municipality of Demir Hisar.

In the period 1952-1955, the village was within the then Municipality of Dolenci, in which besides the village Babino, there were also the villages Bazernik, Brezovo, Golemo Ilino, Dolenci, Zeleznec, Malo Ilino and Sredorek. In the period 1950-1952, the village was located in the former Municipality of Dolenci, which included the villages of Brezovo, Babino, Bazernik and Dolenci.

Polling station
In the village there is polling station no. 641 according to the State Election Commission, located in the premises of a local community.
In the presidential elections in 2019, a total of 20 voters were registered at this polling station.

Cultural and natural sights

Regular events

Notable individuals

Culture and Sport

Emigration
A huge portion of the population has moved to Skopje, Bitola, Demir Hisar, Veles and other cities in Macedonia. There is also emigration to Australia, France and other countries.

The following emigrants are known individuall until 1951:

From Ugleshovci to: Belgrade (one family).
From Tokmakovci to: Ruma (one family).
From Radevci to: Bitola (four families).
From Gjurkovci to: Bulgaria (one family).
From Despotovci in: Bitola (two families), Kochishte (since 1948), Pribilci (one family) and in the USA (one family).
From Spasenovci to: Bitola (four families) and Sofia (two families).
From Tanevci to: Bitola (six families), Kremenica (one family), Lavci (one family), Bulgaria (one family), Buchin (one family) and Pribilci (one family).
From Jancevci to: Bitola (one family).
From Grashinovci to: Serbia (one family) and Demir Hisar (one family).
From Popovci to: Chepigovo (one family), Bitola (one family), Romania (one family), Skopje (one family), Lopatica (one family), USA (one family) and Ohrid (one family).
From Strezovci to: Bitola (two families) and in Bulgaria (one family).
From Vilipovci to: Demir Hisar (one family), Bulgaria (one family), Florina (one family since 1920) and in the USA (one family).
From Parmakovci to: Demir Hisar (four families).
From Kochovci to: Pribilci (five families).
From Popovci to: Krivogashtani (one family), Bitola (three families), Romania (two families), USA (one family), Belgrade (one family), Sremska Mitrovica (two families) and Sofia (one family).

Gallery

References

Further reading

 Панов, Митко: Енциклопедија на селата во Република Македонија: географски, демографски, и аграрни обележја. Патрија, Скопје, 1998, 15 стр.
 Boškovska, Nada: Spaziergang durch Babino. Makedonische Dorfgeschichte(n). In: Zwischen Adria und Jenissei. Reisen in die Vergangenheit. Werner G. Zimmermann zum 70. Geburtstag. Hrsg. von Nada Boškovska, Carsten Goehrke, Caspar Heer und Anna Pia Maissen. Zürich 1995, p. 19–36.

External links
Маcedonia for beginners: Babino, demir hisar
Babino - Macedonia Timeless
Babino, "Живо наследство - Македонија" - Information as how to reach Babino.
Bookclub for "Алиби", Babino village
"Се санираше најголемата приватна библиотека во Македонија", А1, 9 јануари 2005
Осум баби живеат со клетвата на Бабино

Villages in Demir Hisar Municipality